Veselí nad Lužnicí is a town in Tábor District in the South Bohemian Region of the Czech Republic. It has about 6,300 inhabitants. It lies at the confluence of the Lužnice and Nežárka rivers.

Administrative parts

The town is made up of town parts of Veselí nad Lužnicí I and Veselí nad Lužnicí II, and village of Horusice.

Geography
It lies at the confluence of the Lužnice and Nežárka rivers.

Veselí nad Lužnicí is situated on the northern edge of the Třeboň Basin and is known for its fish ponds and pine forests. There are five artificial lakes south of the town, used for recreational purposes; these were created between 1952 and 1986 by flooding former gravel and sand quarries. An educational trail runs around them.

The southern part of the municipal territory lies in the Třeboňsko Protected Landscape Area, which was declared an UNESCO biosphere reserve.

History
The town was first mentioned in 1259 as a hamlet and a redoubt on the salt road from Austria to Prague. King Charles IV gave it the status of a town in 1362. In the 15th century, the town saw many fires and was looted by the Hussites. It was Peter Vok of Rosenberg, a famous fish pond founder and supporter, who let the town grow again a hundred years later.

The Thirty Years' War (1618–1648) damaged the town badly again – with only 69 people remaining. New development came with the Schwarzenberg dynasty in the second half of the 17th century. Veselí stayed in their possession until the end of the World War I in 1918.

It was originally two separate towns – Veselí nad Lužnicí and Mezimostí nad Nežárkou (a town since 1908). They were joined in 1943 to make one town under the present name.

Demographics

Economy
The railway station is one of the biggest local employers. The sand quarrying, concrete production and food industries are also long-established in the town.

Transport
Since the late 19th century, Veselí nad Lužnicí has been an important railway junction between České Budějovice, Tábor, Třeboň and Jindřichův Hradec.

The D3 motorway runs next to the town.

Sights

The renaissance Old Town Hall from 1616 is the main building on the square and together with the neighbouring museum, which was also built in 1616, forms an architectonic unit. The New Town Hall was built in 1897.

The Church of the Exaltation of the Holy Cross is the main landmark. Its existence was first mentioned in 1259 and is the oldest monument in the town. Chapel of Saint Mark (1754) and the Chapel of St. Florian in Mezimostí (1715) are other notable buildings.

Notable people
Karel Weis (1862–1944), composer, collector of folk songs and folklorist; worked here
Karel Traxler (1866–1936), chess master; lived here
Emil Hlobil (1901–1987), composer and music professor
Lubomír Štrougal (1924–2023), politician and prime minister
Saša Večtomov (1930–1989), cellist; buried here
Vladimír Večtomov (1946–2015), guitarist

Twin towns – sister cities

Veselí nad Lužnicí is twinned with:
 Diemtigen, Switzerland
 Yspertal, Austria

Veselí nad Lužnicí also cooperates with other Czech municipalities and villages with Veselí in their names.

References

External links

Cities and towns in the Czech Republic
Populated places in České Budějovice District